Dorcadion urmianum is a species of beetle in the family Cerambycidae. It was described by Plavilstshikov in 1937.

References

urmianum
Beetles described in 1937